The Linford Christie Stadium is an athletics stadium in Wormwood Scrubs, West London, England.

The venue first opened as the West London Stadium in 1967. It initially had a cinder running track, which was upgraded to a synthetic surface in 1973. In 1993 the stadium was renamed after Olympic 100 metres gold medallist Linford Christie, who often trained at the venue with the Thames Valley Harriers.

The stadium was redeveloped further between 2004 and 2006, when additional facilities for sports including football, rugby and hockey were installed. The work was funded by London Borough of Hammersmith and Fulham, the Football Foundation, Chelsea F.C. and Barclays. Chelsea players John Terry and Shaun Wright-Phillips attended the re-opening. The video for "So Many Roads" by Example was filmed here in 2007.

References

External links
UK Running Track Directory page

Athletics venues in London
Sport in Hammersmith and Fulham
Sports venues completed in 1967
1967 establishments in England